Def Squad is an American rap supergroup consisting of Erick Sermon, Redman, Keith Murray, Hurricane G, and Jamal. Before officially forming as a group to release an album in 1998, they had each been featured on tracks by each other. The Def Squad was formed following the disbandment of the Hit Squad, who broke up after the struggles between EPMD members Erick Sermon and Parrish Smith.

They are known for their remake of "Rapper's Delight" by Sugarhill Gang.

The Squad continued to record on each other's solo albums.

Discography 

African-American musical groups
East Coast hip hop groups
Hip hop collectives
Musical groups established in 1996
Hip hop supergroups
Hardcore hip hop groups
Def Squad members